Wes Hilliard (born October 12, 1973) is an American politician who served in the Oklahoma House of Representatives from the 22nd district from 2004 to 2012.

References

1973 births
Living people
People from Pauls Valley, Oklahoma
Democratic Party members of the Oklahoma House of Representatives